The Colne Valley Railway is a heritage railway based at Castle Hedingham Station, near Halstead in Essex, England.

History 
The railway occupies part of the former Colne Valley and Halstead Railway (CVHR), which opened in stages between 16 April 1860 and 10 May 1863.

On 19 April 1965, all transiting freight traffic ended. The line was dismantled and infrastructure demolished or recovered by contractors a year later, and the land on which the heritage railway station now sits resold to a local landowner.

Preservation 
The site was acquired from the landowner in 1973 and the Colne Valley Railway Company Limited formed to operate the railway. A volunteers' supporters body, the Colne Valley Railway Preservation Society (CVRPS), was formed in 1974. Although originally a main line railway, the track and infrastructure was taken up in the late 60s, so on acquisition there was no remaining infrastructure onsite. The bridge crossing the River Colne came from Earls Colne in 1982.

The first steam locomotive to arrive on site was Hunslet "Austerity" 0-6-0ST No.WD190 shortly followed by No.72. Members of the CVRPS began to operate the locomotives on a short section of line. Despite its still short length, presently the CVR is home to three ex-mainline steam locomotives.

Closure threat 
CVR Company Limited was acquired by Australian businessman Christopher Young in 2005. The CVRPS agreed a five-year renegotiable lease to take over the operation of the railway for the 2006 season. In 2014, when the 5-year lease expires on 31 December 2015, Young offered the CVRPS the option of buying the site's freehold. The CVRPS pursued sufficient funds and loans to complete the terms by December 2015, but were told that Young's plans had changed.

The CVRPS were informed at their Annual General Meeting on 22 March 2015 that CVR Co. Ltd. had decided the railway no longer featured in future plans for the site and planning permission would be sought for redevelopment of the site, which lies in a conservation area – a subsequent Freedom of Information request by local media discovered that outline planning permission had been sought for 600 houses on the station. The CVRPS were served notice that operations must cease after 31 December 2015, with the CVRPS having to remove all its rolling stock and buildings during 2016, with possibility of relocation to another heritage railway.

In June 2015, it was announced by Steam Railway magazine that a new site adjacent to the current one had been procured. Permission was being sought from CVR Co. Ltd. to operate as normal during 2016, with the railway operating from the new site from 2017. Later that month, it was announced by Steam Railway magazine that the proposed new site was "no longer viable" due to reasons that were not disclosed.

In September 2015, CVRPS was formally converted into a charity called Colne Valley Railway Preservation Ltd. (CVRPL).

On 6 December 2016 CVRPL announced that the railway, on its original site, was now safe and the site purchased from CVR Co. Ltd. as a result of obtaining a heritage lottery fund grant for £1.75m along with support from Braintree District Council.

Motive power

Steam Locomotives

Diesel & Electric Locomotives

Diesel Multiple Units

Electric Multiple Units

HSTs

References

External links 

Colne Valley Railway website

Heritage railways in Essex
London and North Eastern Railway constituents